RTPC might refer to:

 a radial time projection chamber
 the Roads and Transport Policing Command of London, United Kingdom